Shadow of a Doubt is the second studio album by American rapper Freddie Gibbs. It was released on November 20, 2015, by ESGN and Empire Distribution.

Critical reception

Shadow of a Doubt received positive reviews from music critics. At Metacritic, which assigns a normalized rating out of 100 to reviews from mainstream critics, the album received an average score of 78, based on 12 reviews, which indicates "generally favorable reviews". Michael Madden of Consequence of Sound said, "Even with all its different sounds, Shadow of a Doubt leaves one clear impression: Freddie Gibbs is a restless artist who continues to find meaning in his Gary story and beyond, knowing that the details can prepare him for whatever comes next." Keith Nelson Jr. of HipHopDX said, "When he ends the album with “Cold Ass Nigga,” the most demonstrably aggressive verse on the album, you realize Shadow of a Doubt isn't Gibbs flipping to go pop, but a man secure enough in the foundation he has laid to take a leap of faith." Max Mertens of Pitchfork Media stated "While the final result is less cohesive, and could benefit from trimming two or three songs, there’s no denying Gibbs’ versatility."

Track listing

Notes
  signifies a co-producer
 "Lately" and "Basketball Wives" features additional vocals by Duntea Davis
 "Lately" features additional vocals by Paxton "Paxman" Miller
 "10 Times" features additional vocals by Brittany B
 "Insecurities" features additional vocals by River Tiber
 "Diamonds" features additional vocals by 12til

Sample credits
 "Careless" contains a sample of "Amazing", written and performed by George Michael.
 "Fuckin' Up the Count" contains samples of audio from various episodes of The Wire.
 "Extradite" contains a sample of "Nautilus", written and performed by Bob James.
 "Forever and a day" contains a sample of "Tubular Bells, Pt. 1", written and performed by Mike Oldfield.

Charts

References

2015 albums
Freddie Gibbs albums
Empire Distribution albums
Albums produced by Frank Dukes
Albums produced by Kaytranada
Albums produced by Boi-1da
Albums produced by Mike Dean (record producer)
Albums produced by Murda Beatz